The Kirov Plant, Kirov Factory or Leningrad Kirov Plant (LKZ) is a major Russian mechanical engineering and agricultural machinery manufacturing plant in St. Petersburg, Russia. It was established in 1789, then moved to its present site in 1801 as a foundry for cannonballs. The Kirov Plant is sometimes confused with another Leningrad heavy weapons manufacturer, Factory No. 185 (S.M. Kirov). Recently the main production of the company is Kirovets heavy tractors.

History
In 1868 Nikolay Putilov (1820-1880) purchased the bankrupt plant; at the Putilov Works the Putilov Company (a joint-stock holding company from 1873) initially produced rolling stock for railways. The establishment boomed during the Russian  industrialization of the 1890s, with the work-force quadrupling in a decade, reaching 12,400 in 1900. The factory traditionally produced goods for the  Russian government, with railway products accounting for more than half of its total output. Starting in 1900 it also produced artillery, eventually becoming a major supplier of it to the Imperial Russian Army alongside the state arsenals. By 1917 it grew into a giant enterprise that was by far the largest in the city of St. Petersburg.

In December 1904, during the antecedent to the 1905 Russian Revolution, four workers at the plant, then called 'Putilov Ironworks', were fired because of their participation in strikes during Bloody Sunday. However, the plant manager asserted that they were fired for unrelated reasons. Virtually the entire workforce of the Putilov Ironworks went on strike when the plant manager refused to accede to their requests that the workers be rehired. Sympathy strikes in other parts of the city raised the number of strikers up to 150,000 workers in 382 factories. By 21 January [O.S. 8 January] 1905, the city had no electricity and no newspapers whatsoever and all public areas were declared closed.

In February 1917  strikes at the factory contributed to setting in motion the chain of events which led to the February Revolution. After the October Revolution of November 1917 the establishment was renamed Red Putilovite Plant (zavod Krasny Putilovets) and became famous for its  manufacture of the first Soviet tractors, Fordzon-Putilovets, based on the Fordson tractor. The Putilov Plant had a reputation for its revolutionary traditions. In the wake of the assassination in December  1934 of Sergey Kirov, the Leningrad  Communist Party head, the plant was renamed Kirov Factory No. 100.

Since 1962 the factory produces the Kirovets tractor.

During World War II the plant manufactured the KV-1 tank.

The Kirov Plant de-listed from the Moscow Exchange in 2011.

See also
 List of Soviet tank factories
 Trams of Putilov plant

References

 Peter Gatrell (1994), Government, Industry, and Rearmament in Russia, 1900-1914: The Last Argument of Tsarism, Cambridge University Press, .
 Workers Unrest and the Bolshevik Response in 1919 written by Vladimir Brovkin in Slavic Review, Volume 49, Issue 3, (Autumn 1990) page 358-361

External links
 
 
 St Petersburg Tractor Plant Subsidiary that builds tractors and agricultural machinery.
 Kirov Plant @ globalsecurity.org (plant's military production)

 
Agricultural machinery manufacturers of Russia
Tractor manufacturers of Russia
Defence companies of the Soviet Union
Agriculture companies of the Soviet Union
Buildings and structures in Saint Petersburg
1905 Russian Revolution
1789 establishments in the Russian Empire
Manufacturing companies based in Saint Petersburg
Companies formerly listed on the Moscow Exchange
Ministry of Heavy and Transport Machine-Building (Soviet Union)